Agelasta rufa is a species of beetle in the family Cerambycidae. It was described by Stephan von Breuning in 1935, originally under the genus Pseudaemocia. It is known from Japan.

References

rufa
Beetles described in 1935